Israel Aduramo (born Israel Aduramo Oyelumade on 28 December 1968) is an English actor.

Career
Israel has a strong career in film, most prominently in Pirates of the Caribbean, The Long Firm and Dirty Pretty Things. Israel was also a lead in the Royal Shakespeare Company, and performed in David Oyelowo's play The White Devil.

Trivia
He has a stage fighting certificate and speaks Yoruba language.

Filmography
The Film-Maker's Son (2012) - Ahab
Derelict (2010) - Onesimus
Coming Up (2006) - Samson
Pirates of the Caribbean: Dead Man's Chest (2006) - Crippled Man
The Bill (2006) - Mr. Tijani
The Ghost Squad (2005) - PC Paul Bullen
Sensitive Skin (2005) - Police Officer
The Tiger and the Snow (2005) - Soldato americano
New Tricks (2005) - Doctor
Doctors (2005) - Jimmy Adler
Dominion: Prequel to the Exorcist (2005) - Jomo
EastEnders (2005) - Mr. Lake
Judge John Deed (2005) - Del Peabody
Exorcist: The Beginning (2004) - Jomo
The Long Firm (2004) - John Ogungbe
Casualty (2004) - Lewis Clinton
Prime Suspect (2003) - SO19 Officer
Pirates of the Caribbean: The Curse of the Black Pearl (2003) - Crippled Man
The Bill (2003) - Jackson Clarke
Dirty Pretty Things (2002) - Mini Cab Driver
Man and Boy (2002) - Young Waiter

External links

English male film actors
English male soap opera actors
1968 births
Living people